The  is a drawbridge in Nagoya Port in Nagoya, Japan.

History
It was used on a rail line bound for Nagoya but has not been used since the rail line it belonged to was retired in March 1986, and now it remains up at all times.

Heritage Status
Since 1999, it has been a Registered Tangible Cultural Property of Japan of Japan, and it is also registered in Japan as an artifact of the Heritage of Modern Industrialization.

References

Bridges in Japan
Railway bridges in Japan
Bridges completed in 1926
1926 establishments in Japan
Former railway bridges
Former bridges in Japan